In architecture, pavilion has several meanings: 
 It may be a subsidiary building that is either positioned separately or as an attachment to a main building. Often it is associated with pleasure. In palaces and traditional mansions of Asia, there may be pavilions that are either freestanding or connected by covered walkways, as in the Forbidden City (Chinese pavilions), Topkapi Palace in Istanbul, and in Mughal buildings like the Red Fort.
 As part of a large palace, pavilions may be symmetrically placed building blocks that flank (appear to join) a main building block or the outer ends of wings extending from both sides of a central building block, the corps de logis. Such configurations provide an emphatic visual termination to the composition of a large building, akin to bookends.

The word is from French  (Old French ) and it meant a small palace, from Latin  (accusative of ). In Late Latin and Old French, it meant both ‘butterfly’ and ‘tent’, because the canvas of a tent resembled a butterfly's spread wings.

Free-standing structures

Pavilions may be small garden outbuildings, similar to a summer house or a kiosk; small rooms on the roof of a large house, reached only via the roof (rather than by internal stairs) may also be called pavilions. These were particularly popular up to the 18th century and can be equated to the Italian , formerly rendered in English "casino".  These often resembled small classical temples and follies. Especially if there is some space for food preparation, they may be called a banqueting house.  A pavilion built to take advantage of a view may be referred to as a gazebo. Bandstands in a park are a class of pavilion. A  by a swimming pool may have sufficient character and charm to be called a pavilion. By contrast, a free-standing pavilion can also be a far larger building such as the Royal Pavilion at Brighton, which is in fact a large Indian-style palace; however, like its smaller namesakes, the common factor is that it was built for pleasure and relaxation.

A sports pavilion is usually a building adjacent to a sports ground used for changing clothes and often partaking of refreshments. Often it has a verandah to provide protection from the sun for spectators. In cricket grounds, as at Lord's, a cricket pavilion tends to be used for the building the players emerge from and return to, even when this is actually a large building including a grandstand.  A pavilion in stadia, especially baseball parks, is a typically single-decked covered seating area (as opposed to the more expensive seating area of the main grandstand and the less expensive seating area of the uncovered bleachers).

Classical architecture
Externally, pavilions may be emphasised by any combination of a change in height, profile (a flat facade may end in round pavilions, or flat ones that project out), colour, material, and ornament. Internally they may be part of a rectangular block, or only connected to the main block by a thin section of building. The two 18th-century English country houses of Houghton Hall and Holkham Hall illustrate these different approaches in turn.

In the Place des Vosges (1605–1612), Paris, twin pavilions mark the centers of the north and south sides of the square. With their triple archways, they function like gatehouses that give access to the privileged space of the square. French gatehouses had been built in the form of such pavilions in the preceding century.

Other uses
In some areas, a pavilion is a term for a hunting lodge. The  in Luberon, France, is a typical 18th-century aristocratic hunting pavilion. The pavilion, located on the site of an old Roman villa, includes a garden , which was used by the guests for receptions.

Gallery

See also

 Bandstand
 Chahartaq (Persian pavilion)
 Chinese pavilion
 Dance hall (dance pavilion)
 Dharamshala (type of building)
 Gazebo
 Mirror tent
 Royal Pavilion, Brighton, England
 Sala Thai (Thai pavilion)

References

External links

 
Buildings and structures by type
Garden features